At least two ships have been named Star:

 , was built in Calcutta in 1800. Between 1803 and 1811 she made three seal hunting voyages. (In 1805 she transferred her registry to Great Britain.) From 1812 she sailed as a merchantman until she was wrecked on 18 December 1829 on a voyage to Jamaica.
 , was launched in New York in 1812. She was captured in 1813. In 1815 she sailed to Batavia under a license from the British East India Company (EIC). On her way back a privateer from the United States captured her in a notable single-ship action and then sent her into New York.

See also
 , for warships of the Royal Navy
 , for warships of the United States Navy
 , a Canadian naval establishment

Ship names